El habilitado is a 1971 Argentine film. It was directed by Jorge Cedron, written by Miguel Briante and Cedron, and starred Héctor Alterio, Carlos Antón, and Billy Cedrón.

Plot summary 
The link between five employees of a Mar del Plata store who try to climb positions on their sad situation.

Cast 

 Héctor Alterio   
 Carlos Antón     
 Billy Cedrón      
 Pablo Cedrón   
 Gladys Cicagno 
 Marta Gam                     
 José María Gutiérrez                                  
 Claude Marting                             
 Norberto Pagani                                          
 Ana María Picchio                                       
 Alfredo Quesada                          
 Héctor Tealdi                  
 Walter Vidarte

Reception 
Director Cedrón was quoted in Clarín as saying, "They are not going to find in my film those vast theories about reality that some French filmmakers construct, I want them to find reality ... not a generalized, abstract reality ... In my film there is more room for the aesthetics of a Roberto Arlt, a Beckett let the signatures of some nouvelle addicts wander".

A review in Clarín read: "Film language stripped of all mannerism, with stark images... each of the characters is precisely defined."

Manrupe and Portela wrote in Un diccionario de films argentinos that it was a "[g]ood approach to an office story, its pettiness and competitiveness."

References

External links 

 

1970s Spanish-language films